This is a list of minister from Babulal Gaur cabinets starting from August 2004. Babulal Gaur is the leader of Bharatiya Janata Party was sworn in the Chief Ministers of Madhya Pradesh in December 2003. Here is the list of the ministers of his ministry.

Cabinet Ministers 

 Babulal Gaur - Chief Minister
 Gauri Shankar Shejwar
 Kailash Chawla
 Raghavji
 Dhal Singh Bisen
 Gopal Bhargava
 Kailash Vijayvargiya
 Choudhury Chandrabhan Singh
 Narendra Singh Tomar
 Kusum Mehdele
 Ramakant Tiwari
 Om Prakash Dhurve
 Himmat Singh Kothari
 Archana Chitnis

Minister of State 

 Anoop Mishra
 Meena Singh
 Jagdish Mubel
 Badrilal Yadav
 Paras Chandra Jain
 Kamal Patel
 Narottam Mishra
 Ajay Vishnoi
 Umashankar Gupta
 Antar Singh Arya
 Rampal Singh

Former Ministers 

 Shivnarayan Jagirdar
 Harnam Singh Rathore
 Dilip Bhatere

See also 

 Government of Madhya Pradesh
 Madhya Pradesh Legislative Assembly

References

Bharatiya Janata Party state ministries
2004 in Indian politics
Madhya Pradesh ministries
2004 establishments in Madhya Pradesh
2005 disestablishments in India
Cabinets established in 2004
Cabinets disestablished in 2005